The Muppet Movie is a 1979 American musical road comedy film directed by James Frawley, produced by Jim Henson, and the first theatrical film featuring the Muppets. A co-production between the United Kingdom and the United States, the film was written by The Muppet Show writers Jerry Juhl and Jack Burns. Produced between the first and second half of The Muppet Shows third season, the film tells the origin story of the Muppets, as Kermit the Frog embarks on a cross-country trip to Los Angeles, encountering several of the Muppets—who all share the same ambition of finding success in professional show business—along the way while being pursued by Doc Hopper, a greedy restaurateur with intentions of employing Kermit as a spokesperson for his frog legs business.

The film stars Muppet performers Henson, Frank Oz, Jerry Nelson, Richard Hunt, and Dave Goelz, as well as Charles Durning and Austin Pendleton, and it features cameo appearances by Dom DeLuise, James Coburn, Edgar Bergen (in his final film appearance before his death), Steve Martin, and Mel Brooks, among others. Notable for its surreal humour, meta-references and prolific use of cameos, The Muppet Movie was released by Associated Film Distribution in the United Kingdom on May 31, 1979, and in the United States on June 22, 1979, and it received critical praise, including two Academy Award nominations for Paul Williams and Kenneth Ascher's musical score and their song, "Rainbow Connection". The success of The Muppet Movie led to several other feature films and television series starring the Muppets across different media. In 2009, the film was deemed "culturally, historically, or aesthetically significant" by the Library of Congress and selected for preservation in the National Film Registry.

Plot

The story opens with the Muppets sitting down at a private screening to watch a movie, for not only a screen testing, but as a pastiche of how they all met.

Kermit the Frog lives a simple life in a Florida swamp. After he plays his banjo and sings "Rainbow Connection", he is approached by Bernie (Dom DeLuise), a talent agent who encourages Kermit to pursue a career in show business. Inspired by the idea of "making millions of people happy", Kermit sets off on a cross-country trip to Hollywood.

Kermit meets Fozzie Bear, who is working as a hapless stand-up comedian, and Kermit invites Fozzie on his journey. The two set out in Fozzie's 1951 Studebaker, but are soon pursued by entrepreneur Doc Hopper (Charles Durning) and his assistant Max (Austin Pendleton) in an attempt by Hopper to convince Kermit to be the new spokesfrog of Hopper's struggling French-fried frog legs restaurant franchise. Horrified, Kermit kindly refuses and he and Fozzie drive away. Unwilling to accept Kermit's refusal, Hopper resorts to increasingly forceful means of persuasion. In an old church, Kermit and Fozzie meet the rock band Dr. Teeth and the Electric Mayhem, and the band's manager Scooter, who help them disguise their car. Driving on, they meet and are joined by Gonzo and his girlfriend Camilla the Chicken, who are also interested in becoming movie stars. They trade in their failing vehicle at a used car lot, where they meet Sweetums. They invite Sweetums to come with them, but he runs away. The others drive away, only for Sweetums to emerge and reveal that he had only gone to pack his things.

The group meets Miss Piggy at a county fair, and she and Kermit immediately become love-stricken with each other. When Kermit and Miss Piggy meet for dinner that night, Hopper and Max sneak up on Miss Piggy and abduct her as bait to lure Kermit. When Kermit arrives at the designated location, mad scientist Professor Krassman (Mel Brooks) tries to brainwash Kermit into performing in Hopper's advertisements, but Miss Piggy furiously knocks out Hopper's henchmen and causes Krassman to be brainwashed by his own device. However, immediately after the fight and saving Kermit, Miss Piggy receives a job offer and promptly abandons a devastated Kermit.

Joined by Rowlf the Dog and reunited with Miss Piggy along the way, the Muppets continue their journey to Hollywood, but their car breaks down in the desert. Sitting at a campfire, the group sadly realizes that they will likely miss the audition the next day. Kermit wanders off, ashamed for bringing his friends on a fruitless journey, but some personal reflection restores his commitment. He returns to camp, where he discovers the Electric Mayhem have come to their rescue, having learned of their plight by reading ahead in the film's script. The Mayhem offer to drive the entire group the rest of the way in their bus.

The group is warned by a reformed Max that Hopper has hired an assassin, Snake Walker (Scott Walker), to kill Kermit.  Kermit decides to face his aggressor and proposes a Western-style showdown in a nearby ghost town. There, they find inventor Dr. Bunsen Honeydew and his assistant Beaker. Kermit confronts Hopper with an appeal to Hopper's own hopes and dreams, but Hopper is unmoved and orders his henchmen to kill Kermit and his friends. They are saved when one of Dr. Honeydew's inventions, "insta-grow" pills, temporarily enlarges Mayhem drummer Animal, who frightens away Hopper and his henchmen for good.

Once the Muppets reach the Hollywood studio, they finally meet studio executive Lew Lord (Orson Welles), who signs the Muppets to a "standard 'rich and famous' contract". The first take in their attempt to perform the script goes awry when Gonzo crashes into the prop rainbow, and an explosion blows a hole in the roof of the studio. However, a real rainbow shines through the hole and onto the Muppets. Joined by other Muppet characters from Sesame Street, Emmet Otter's Jug-Band Christmas, and The Land of Gorch, the Muppets all sing together. 

Sweetums then tears through the movie screen in the theater, ending the film and catching up with the rest of the crew as they congratulate each other on their performances.

Cast

Muppets Performers

 Jim Henson as Kermit the Frog, Rowlf, Dr. Teeth, Waldorf and The Swedish Chef
 Frank Oz as Miss Piggy, Fozzie Bear, Animal, Sam the Eagle, and Marvin Suggs
 Jerry Nelson as Floyd Pepper, Crazy Harry, Robin the Frog, Lew Zealand and Camilla the Chicken
 Richard Hunt as Scooter, Statler, Janice, Sweetums and Beaker
 Dave Goelz as The Great Gonzo, Zoot, Dr. Bunsen Honeydew and Doglion
 Caroll Spinney as Big Bird

Frank Oz appears in a cameo as a biker who beats up Fozzie Bear while Steve Whitmire appears as a man in the Bogen County Fair.

Humans
 Charles Durning as Doc Hopper, a businessman, entrepreneur, and restaurateur.
 Austin Pendleton as Max, Doc Hopper's shy right-hand man and sidekick.
 Scott Walker as Snake Walker, an assassin who specializes in killing frogs.
 H.B. Haggerty as Lumberjack
 Bruce Kirby as Gate Guard
 James Frawley as a Waiter at El Sleezo Café where Fozzie is doing his comedy act
 Melinda Dillon as a Woman with Balloon (uncredited)

Cameo guest stars
 Dom DeLuise as Bernie, a Hollywood agent who meets Kermit in the swamp.  The character's name alludes to Bernie Brillstein, talent agent and producer of the original Muppet Show.
 James Coburn as the El Sleezo Café Owner
 Madeline Kahn as an El Sleezo Patron with the same rhotacism and personality Kahn used for Lili von Shtupp in Blazing Saddles
 Telly Savalas as El Sleezo Tough
 Carol Kane as "Myth" (summoned by name)
 Paul Williams as the El Sleezo Pianist.
 Milton Berle as Mad Man Mooney, a used car salesman who employs Sweetums as a jack.
 Elliott Gould as the Compère who announces Miss Piggy as the winner of the Bogen County Beauty Pageant.
 Edgar Bergen as himself and Charlie McCarthy playing judges at the County Fair. This appearance marks Bergen's final film role; he died soon after.
 Bob Hope as an Ice Cream Vendor serving cones to Fozzie at the County Fair.
 Richard Pryor as a Balloon Vendor selling balloons to Gonzo at the County Fair.
 Steve Martin as an Insolent Waiter working at the restaurant where Rowlf plays piano.
 Mel Brooks as Professor Max Krassman, a mad scientist hired by Doc Hopper.
 Cloris Leachman as Miss Tracy, Lew Lord's secretary who is allergic to animals.
 Orson Welles as Lew Lord, a Hollywood producer and studio executive. The character's name alludes to Sir Lew Grade, head of ATV, the British company that co-produced the original Muppet Show.

Production

Development
After the box office of the Muppets has grown from the success of The Muppet Show, Lew Grade was asked to finance the production of the film. He agreed and signed the deal with his company ITC Entertainment. The opportunity helped Jim Henson finance the film he has dreamed of before.

When the film was greenlit, Jim Henson and selected team members traveled to California various times to develop the script, music, and infrastructure in Hollywood to shoot the film. James Frawley was hired to direct the movie for the accomplishments of its challenges.

Frawley traveled to London to meet Jim Henson. They were concerned that the Muppets would not blend well in real life. They flew to Los Angeles, and along with Frank Oz and the team, they filmed and tested how the characters would appear in real-world locations during the first few days of June 1978 in a meadow. During filming tests, a cow was ambled near Fozzie for an unexpected rear look at a comparison between fake and natural fur hair. The camera tests attracted the investment of ITC Entertainment. For the rest of the month, Henson leaded company meetings and attended family events in New York City. On July 3, 1978, Henson flew to Los Angeles again to begin shooting for the film.

Filming 
Principal photography began on July 5, 1978, and continued for 87 days during summer and fall of that year. Each minute took a day to be filmed. Filming locations included Albuquerque, New Mexico as well as various parts of Los Angeles and Northern California, including San Fernando Valley.  Additionally, the interior shots were filmed at CBS-MTM Studios. All of the sets were elevated by five feet to allow the puppeteers to perform. Austin Pendleton recalled that the film was shot on "a very unhappy set, because Jim [Frawley] was very unhappy directing that movie. And I noticed that was the only time the Muppet people used an outside person to direct a Muppet movie. They never did that again. After that, it was either Jim Henson or Frank Oz. And I would have liked to have been in one of those, because those sets were very harmonious. But this was not." According to Henson, shooting the movie was slower than in television. No effects were added after filming concluded.

Several shots required Muppets standing and acting in a full-body shot. To perform Kermit sitting on a log, Henson squeezed into a specially designed metal container complete with an air hose (to breathe), a rubber sleeve which came out of the top to perform Kermit and a monitor to see his performance, and placed himself under the water, log, and the Kermit puppet. He was also assisted in this operation by Kathryn Mullen and Steve Whitmire. During breaks, cups of ice tea were given to Henson through the rubber sleeve since he could not easily leave the tank. Rescuers had to stand by the tank to pull Henson out if the tank leaked or the air supply had difficulties. The scene took five days to be filmed. 

To have Kermit ride a bicycle in a full-body shot, a Kermit puppet with legs was posed onto the seat and his legs and arms were attached to the pedals and handlebars. An overhead crane with a marionette system held the bicycle through strong strings invisible to the camera, guiding the bicycle forward. The crane and system were out of the camera's frame of vision. Specially made, remote-controlled puppets were placed on the set and controlled by puppeteers out of the frame. A dancing Kermit and Fozzie Bear were operated by Henson and Oz in front of a blue screen, and they were composited onto a separate reel of the stage. For scenes involving Fozzie driving a Studebaker, cables, TV monitors, puppeteers, and its Muppets were filled in. A dwarf would sit in the trunk and control via remote control. A television monitor showed what was ahead.

The closing reprise of "Rainbow Connection" featured a crowd of more than 250 Muppet characters—virtually every Muppet that had been created up to that point in time. According to Henson Archivist Karen Falk, 137 puppeteers were enlisted from the Puppeteers of America (along with the regular Muppets performers) to perform every Muppet extant. Prior to the day-long filming of the shot, Henson gave the enthusiastic participants a lesson in the art of cinematic puppetry. The scene involved 150 puppeteers performing in a pit that was 6 feet deep and 17 feet wide. In September 1978, Edgar Bergen, Henson's idol who appeared in a cameo role, died shortly after completing his scenes. Henson was asked by his family to say a few words with Kermit for his memorial service. Henson agreed, and he attended Bergen's memorial service for its speech. Henson dedicated the film to his memory.

Music

The film's music and lyrics were written by Paul Williams and Kenneth Ascher. Regarding the music's composition, Williams said; "Jim Henson gave you more [creative] freedom than anybody I've ever worked with in my life. I said, 'You want to hear the songs as we're writing them?' He said, 'No. I'll hear them in the studio. I know I'm gonna love them.' You just don't get that kind of freedom on a project these days." "Never Before, Never Again" was originally sung by Johnny Mathis, but was changed to Miss Piggy when Jim Henson thought it would be funnier if she sang it to herself. Mathis would later sang the song in the television special The Muppets Go Hollywood.

"Movin' Right Along", "Never Before, Never Again", and "I Hope That Somethin' Better Comes Along" were shortened in the film, compared to their soundtrack versions, for continuity purposes. The latter, a duet between Rowlf and Kermit, contained references that the studio considered too mature for children, although the song appeared complete in the British theatrical and home video debut versions.

Release
In May 1979, CBS aired The Muppets Go Hollywood, a one-hour television special that promoted the then-upcoming release of The Muppet Movie. In April, the film had been promoted when the Muppets hosted The Tonight Show Starring Johnny Carson. Additionally, a book adaptation of The Muppet Movie, adapted by Steven Crist, was published by Peacock Press/Bantam Books.

Theatrical releases
The Muppet Movie had a royal premiere at the Leicester Square Theatre in London on May 31, 1979, attended by Princess Anne. In the United States, it was first opened with a Hollywood party at the Coconut Grove. It was later released with limited release in New York City and Los Angeles on June 22, 1979. The film rolled out gradually throughout the United States. In celebration of the film's 40th anniversary, The Muppet Movie returned to theaters for two days on July 25 and 30, 2019.

Home media
The Muppet Movie was the first film by ITC Films to be released on home video when Magnetic Video issued it in May 1980, having acquired the video rights to ITC's films. It was reissued in 1982 and 1984 by CBS/Fox Video. On January 29, 1993, Buena Vista Home Video re-released the film under their Jim Henson Video label on VHS and LaserDisc, pricing at $24.99. The movie was reissued again on VHS by Columbia TriStar Home Video and Jim Henson Home Entertainment on June 1, 1999, followed by a DVD release on June 5, 2001. After Disney's acquisition of the film as part of the core Muppets franchise, the film was reissued as a Walt Disney Pictures release and was re-released by Walt Disney Studios Home Entertainment on DVD on November 29, 2005 as part of the Kermit's 50th Anniversary Edition line. Disney released the film as the Nearly 35th Anniversary Edition on Blu-ray Disc and DVD on August 13, 2013. The film now streams on Disney+.

Reception

Box office
In its first six days at the Leicester Square Theatre, it grossed $31,884. The film would later earn over $65 million in the United States and Canada, returning $32 million in box office rentals. Ever since its release, The Muppet Movie was the highest-grossing puppet film until the release of The Muppets in 2011.

The film's successful theatrical release encouraged Lew Grade into furthering his own film distribution company, which later backfired with the massive box office failures of Can't Stop the Music (from EMI) and Raise the Titanic (from ITC), both released by Associated Film Distribution just a year later.

Critical reception
The Muppet Movie currently holds an 88% approval rating on Rotten Tomatoes with an average score of 8.00/10, based on 52 reviews. The site's consensus says "The Muppet Movie, the big-screen debut of Jim Henson's plush creations, is smart, lighthearted, and fun for all ages." On Metacritic, the film has a weighted average score of 74 out of 100 based on 7 reviews, indicating "generally favorable reviews".

Roger Ebert of the Chicago Sun-Times gave the film three-and-a-half out of four stars. In his favorable review, he was fascinated that "The Muppet Movie not only stars the Muppets but, for the first time, shows us their feet." Vincent Canby of The New York Times offered equal praise, stating that the film "demonstrates once again that there's always room in movies for unbridled amiability when it is governed by intelligence and wit." Gene Siskel of the Chicago Tribune gave the film three-and-a-half stars out of four and called it "surely one of the summer's most entertaining films," which "does a fairly nice job of trying to be all things to all people. Which is not an easy job." Dale Pollock of Variety wrote, "'The Muppet Movie' is a winner... Script by Jerry Juhl and Jack Burns incorporates the zingy one-liners and bad puns that have become the teleseries' trade mark, but also develops the Muppets themselves as thinking, feeling characters."

Charles Champlin of the Los Angeles Times wrote, "as you might well expect, it is hip, funny, technically ingenious, fast-moving, melodious, richly produced, contemporary and equally and utterly beguiling to grown-ups and small persons." Katrine Ames of Newsweek stated, "'The Muppet Movie' is a delectable grab bag of influences — stories by L. Frank Baum and Lewis Carroll, Westerns, the Crosby-Hope and Garland-Rooney movies — as well as its own inventive devices. The result is a kind of 'That's Entertainment!' with a plot attached. Its charm — and success — lie primarily in its loving pokes at Hollywood conventions and in the lovable characters who do the poking."

Accolades 

American Film Institute Lists
 AFI's 100 Years...100 Laughs – Nominated
 AFI's 100 Years...100 Songs:
 "Rainbow Connection" – #74
 AFI's Greatest Movie Musicals – Nominated

Legacy 

In 2009, it was selected for preservation in the National Film Registry by the Library of Congress for being "culturally, historically or aesthetically significant". In 2020, "Rainbow Connection" was deemed "culturally, historically, or aesthetically significant" by the Library of Congress and selected for preservation in the National Recording Registry.

One of the two pairs of 1951 Studebaker Commander Coupes used in the film is now on display at the Studebaker National Museum in South Bend, Indiana.

Notes

References

External links

  at Disney.com
 
 
 
 
 

The Muppets films
1979 films
1970s adventure films
1970s musical films
1970s musical comedy films
1970s comedy road movies
1970s American films
American children's adventure films
American independent films
American musical comedy films
American comedy road movies
British adventure films
British musical comedy films
1970s English-language films
Films about Hollywood, Los Angeles
Films directed by James Frawley
Films set in Florida
Films set in Georgia (U.S. state)
Films set in Los Angeles
Films set in New Mexico
Films set in studio lots
Films shot in Los Angeles
Films shot in New Mexico
Films with screenplays by Jerry Juhl
ITC Entertainment films
Musicals by Paul Williams (songwriter)
Self-reflexive films
The Jim Henson Company films
United States National Film Registry films
1979 comedy films
Films produced by Jim Henson
Walt Disney Pictures films
1970s British films